Meziane Touati (born 14 April 1969 in Algeria) is an Algerian retired footballer.

Career

In 1996, Touati signed for Ferencvárosi TC.ref></ref>

References

Algerian footballers
Living people
1969 births
Association football forwards
Footballers from Algiers
Ferencvárosi TC footballers
Budapesti VSC footballers
Budapest Honvéd FC players
21st-century Algerian people